This is a partial list of artificial materials left on the Moon, many during the missions of the Apollo program. The table below does not include lesser Apollo mission artificial objects, such as a hammer and other tools, retroreflectors, Apollo Lunar Surface Experiments Packages, or the commemorative, artistic, and personal objects left by the twelve Apollo astronauts, such as the United States flags, the commemorative plaques attached to the ladders of the six Apollo Lunar Modules, the silver astronaut pin left by Alan Bean in honor of Clifton C. Williams whom he replaced, the Bible left by David Scott, the Fallen Astronaut statuette and memorial plaque placed by the crew of Apollo 15, the Apollo 11 goodwill messages disc, or the golf balls Alan Shepard hit during an Apollo 14 moonwalk.

Five S-IVB third stages of Saturn V rockets from the Apollo program crashed into the Moon, and are the heaviest human-made objects on the lunar surface. Besides the 2019 Chinese rover Yutu-2, the only artificial objects on the Moon that are still in use are the retroreflectors for the Lunar Laser Ranging experiments left there by the Apollo 11, 14, and 15 astronauts, and by the Soviet Union's Lunokhod 1 and Lunokhod 2 missions.

Objects at greater than 90 degrees east or west are on the far side of the Moon, including Ranger 4, Lunar Orbiter 1, Lunar Orbiter 2, Lunar Orbiter 3, and the lunar rover Yutu-2.

List

Legend

Table of objects

Image gallery

See also

Apollo Lunar Surface Experiments Package
List of artificial objects on extraterrestrial surfaces
List of retroreflectors on the Moon
Lunar plaques
Human presence in space
Timeline of Solar System exploration
Tourism on the Moon

Notes

Footnotes

References

External links
 NASA catalogue of manmade material on the Moon
 List of Apollo 11 artifacts on the Moon
 Lunar Litter: A short film about debris left behind on manned Moon missions

Artificial Objects On The Moon
Artificial Objects On The Moon

Moon
Moon